The Essential is a compilation album by Australian singer, John Farnham. It was released in January 2009.

Track listing 
CD (2426622)
 "Sadie (The Cleaning Lady)" - 3:19	
 "Underneath the Arches" - 2:01	
 "Friday Kind of Monday" - 2:45	
 "Raindrops Keep Fallin' on My Head" - 2:32	
 "One" - 2:50	
 "Jamie" - 2:28	
 "Comic Conversation" - 3:18	
 "Rock Me Baby" - 3:20
 "Everything is out of Season" - 3:15
 "Down on the Border"  (Little River Band)  - 2:58
 "Don't You Know It's Magic" - 4:02
 "Playing to Win"  (Little River Band) - 2:59

References 

John Farnham compilation albums
2009 compilation albums
EMI Records compilation albums